Maria de Fátima da Veiga (born June 22, 1957) is a Cape Verdean politician and diplomat. Veiga was the foreign minister from 2002–2004. She was the first female foreign minister in Cape Verde's history.

Veiga was born on the island of São Vicente.  She later attended some higher education institutes including the University of Aix-en-Provence in the south of France, the German Foundation in Berlin, the Prague and in Brazil. In 1980, she started to work for the Cape Verdean Ministry of External Affairs.  Between 2001 and 2002, she was the Ambassador of Cape Verde to Cuba.  When she was a foreign minister, she visited Paris from January 9 to 12, 2002.

For a few years in 2007 she was the Ambassador of Cape Verde to the United States. She presented her credentials to President George Bush on August 16, 2007.

Since February 20, 2014, she is the Capeverdean ambassador to France.  She succeeded José Armando Filomeno Ferreira Duarte who was the longest serving ambassador to France.

Notes

1957 births
Living people
Ambassadors of Cape Verde to the United States
Ambassadors of Cape Verde to France
Foreign ministers of Cape Verde
People from São Vicente, Cape Verde
Female foreign ministers
Women ambassadors
Cape Verdean women diplomats
University of Provence alumni
21st-century women politicians
Women government ministers of Cape Verde